Major-General John Tombs (1777–1848) was an officer in the British East India Company.

Education
John Tombs was the son of a banker, Joseph Tombs (1745–1818), of Abingdon-on-Thames. He was educated at John Roysse's Free School in Abingdon (now Abingdon School).

Military career
He entered service with the East India Company. He commanded the 3rd Bengal Cavalry at the Siege of Bharatpur (1825–26) and was promoted to major-general in 1838. He retired from the Indian Army to Malta where he died. He sent his six sons home to Abingdon for an English education, the most distinguished of them being the sixth son, Major-General Sir Henry Tombs, VC, KCB (1825–1874).

See also
 List of Old Abingdonians

References

Sources

1777 births
1848 deaths
British Indian Army generals
People educated at Abingdon School
People from Abingdon-on-Thames
Tombs family